The Bode is a river in the German state of Saxony-Anhalt, a left tributary of the Saale. 
It rises in the Harz mountains and drains them in a northerly direction. After  it discharges into the Saale at Nienburg. The river is named after a legendary giant, the wild, rampaging, Bohemian, Prince Bodo, who, according to the Rosstrappe legend changed into a marauding dog that guarded the crown of Princess Brunhilde in the Kronensumpf ("crown marsh") in the present-day Bode Gorge. The gorge is the narrow section of the Bode valley between Treseburg and Thale.

The Bodo legend 

According to tradition, there was once a giant called Bodo who came from Thuringia to pursue Brunhilde, the king's beautiful daughter, whom he wanted to marry against her will. Brunhilde fled on a white stallion (Ross), but they suddenly came to a deep ravine. With one bold leap she reached the rocks on the far side, but her pursuer fell into the abyss. The hoofprint of her horse can still be seen today as the so-called Rosstrappe. Meanwhile, Bodo was turned into a dog. As her horse leapt the gorge, however, the princess lost her golden crown, which was now guarded by the dog Bodo in the valley of the river. The river was given the name Bode after the giant Bodo who was now under a spell.

Geography

Source and catchment areas
The Bode is heavily divided in its source region on the Brocken, the highest peak in the Harz, but its two most important source streams are the: 
 Kalte Bode, which rises at Bodesprung in 

The two rivers, which actually have a temperature difference of 2 °C, merge not far from the Königsburg Ruins immediately before flowing into the Königshütte Dam (a feeder dam or Überleitungssperre).

Other tributaries of the Bode include the Rappbode and the Luppbode. The Rappbode is impounded near Wendefurth by the Rappbode Dam. At the northern end of this reservoir, the Rappbode joins the Bode, which is impounded here by the Wendefurth Dam. Other tributaries of the Bode are the Goldbach, the Holtemme and the Selke.

Waterfalls 
The waterfalls in the Harz are not high. The Upper Bode Falls (Obere Bode-Fall) on the Warme Bode are really a fast-flowing stream (Sturzbach) with small steps about 1 metre in height. Likewise the Lower Bode Falls (Untere Bode-Fall) on the Warme Bode is simply ledge of similar height.
The Bodekessel in the Bode Gorge is a former step in a large hollow, that was reduced in height in 1798 from 2 metres to 1 metre by explosive. The fourth waterfall is in the Kästental.

Course 
Today, the valley is a nature reserve. The Bode Gorge and its villages are the primary setting for Theodor Fontane’s novel, Cécile.

The river then crosses the Harz Foreland in a curving and, in places, diked and canalised, course until it discharges into the Saale at Nienburg. Important Bode tributaries are the Selke and the Holtemme.
Other towns on the Bode river are Quedlinburg, Wegeleben, Gröningen, Oschersleben, Hadmersleben, Egeln and Staßfurt.

The Bode gorge north of Thale is now a protected area.

Dams 

In a hydrological sense every source stream of the Bode has a specific catchment area in the Harz, that is part of the catchment area of the Bode. The catchment areas of the various reservoirs are as follows: for the Wendefurth Reservoir, for the Rappbode Pre-Dam and Rappbode Reservoirs, and for the Königshütte Reservoir, . The Mandelholz Dam impounds the water of the Kalte Bode.

History and culture

Middle Ages 
In the Early Middle Ages the Bode formed the border between the provinces of the Harzgau in the west and the Schwabengau in the east. The two most important Bode crossings at that time were the settlements of  Ditfurt und Gröningen, mentioned frequently in the Fuldau annals.

Modern era 
Heinrich Heine depicts the romantic Bode valley in his 1826 travelogue Die Harzreise:

Flood and low water 

The 'most devastating' floods from the Bode occurred in the years 1539, 1667, 1730, 1740, 1772 and especially at Christmas in 1925. Only on the completion of the Rappbode Dam in 1959 could the risk of flooding be eliminated.

See also 
List of rivers of Saxony-Anhalt

Sources 
 Monika Schönau/Edmund Werner: Die Bode: ein Fluss führt Hochwasser! Sachsen-Anhalt, Staatliches Amt für Umweltschutz Magdeburg, Magdeburg 2000.

References

External links

Further information 

 
Rivers of Saxony-Anhalt
Rivers of the Harz
Rivers of Germany